Krzysztof Kamil Baczyński, (nom de guerre: Jan Bugaj; 22 January 1921 – 4 August 1944) was a Polish poet and Home Army soldier, one of the most well known of the Generation of Columbuses, the young generation of Polish poets, of whom several perished in the Warsaw Uprising and during the German occupation of Poland.

Biography

Baczyński was born in Warsaw into the family of renowned literary critic and soldier of the Polish Legions in World War I, Stanisław Baczyński and school teacher Stefania Zieleńczyk. His mother was a zealous Catholic but with Jewish roots, and as such was treated by the Germans as Jewish. His uncle, Dr. Adam Zieleńczyk, escaped from the Warsaw Ghetto and was killed by Germans in 1943.

Baczynski was baptized on 7 September 1922 in Warsaw. As a child, he suffered from asthma, his heart was very weak and he was in constant threat of tuberculosis. In 1933, he began education at Gimnazjum i Liceum im. Stefana Batorego, he graduated in May 1939. In his class there were future heroes of the Szare Szeregi - Jan Bytnar (Rudy) and Tadeusz Zawadzki (Zośka). Baczynski debuted as a poet some time in 1938 in Strzała - a magazine published by the Organization of Socialist Youth Spartakus, to which he belonged himself. After graduation, he wished to continue his education at Warsaw's Academy of Fine Arts, but the outbreak of World War II ended these plans.

During the German and Soviet (until 1941) occupation of Poland, he continued to work with the left-wing underground press, most notably with the "Płomienie" (Flames) and "Droga" (Way) magazines. At the same time he was a student of Polish language at the secret underground Warsaw University and the Armia Krajowa's "Agricola" NCOs School. He took up several jobs, and in 1943 joined Batalion Zośka, after which he gave up studies, committing himself to the Polish resistance activities. In his apartment, he hid several pieces of weaponry, including submachine guns and grenades.

On 6 July 1942 he married Barbara Drapczyńska, a university colleague. The marriage resulted in a set of erotica written by Baczyński, reputedly one of the most notable in the Polish language. Shortly before the Warsaw Uprising Baczyński gave a copy of all his poems to one of his friends, to hide in Żoliborz. Because of that, they survived the war.

As a member of Scouting Assault Groups (Harcerskie Grupy Szturmowe), Baczyński took part in many sabotage actions throughout the occupation. One of them was derailment of a German military train in August 1944, which resulted in a 26-hour delay of traffic on the strategic connection Warsaw-Białystok.

After the Warsaw Uprising broke out, he joined the "Parasol" battalion. He was killed in action by a German sniper at approximately 4pm on 4 August 1944 in the Blanka Palace in the Warsaw Old Town. He is buried in the Powązki Military Cemetery, together with his pregnant wife, who was killed on 1 September 1944. He was posthumously awarded the Armia Krajowa Cross and in 1947 the Medal for Warsaw 1939-1945 (pl).

In his poems and short novels, Baczyński demonstrated both romantic traditions and catastrophism. His poems depict the brutality of war, and suggest that love is the only force that can effectively defend a human being against it. His talent was highly appreciated by his contemporaries, Stanisław Pigon, upon hearing news of Baczynski joining the Szare Szeregi, said to Kazimierz Wyka: We belong to a nation, whose fate is to shoot at the enemy with diamonds.

Baczyński in Polish culture

 The 1984 film The Fourth Day (Dzień czwarty) tells the story of the last four days of his life.
 In 1965, Polish singer Ewa Demarczyk sings Baczyński poems on LP "Wiersze wojenne" (eng. "War Poems") 
 1990 Jacek Kaczmarski: Kosmopolak – "Barykada (Śmierć Baczyńskiego)",
 1991 Grzegorz Turnau: Naprawdę nie dzieje się nic,
 2005 Lao Che: Powstanie Warszawskie – "Godzina W"
 2007 Zbigniew Hołdys: - Pocałunek
 2012 Tadek (FIRMA) - Elegia o chłopcu polskim
 The 2013 film "Baczyński"
 2020 "Astronomia Poety. Baczyński." − Album by Kwadrofonik and Mela Koteluk
 2021 Jacob George Scyther - "Pomarańczowy Ogór"
2022 sanah - Baczyński (pisz do mnie listy)

Published works
White Magic and Other Poems trans. by Bill Johnston (Los Angeles: Green Integer, 2005).

References

Levine, Madeline G. Contemporary Polish Poetry, 1925-1975 (Boston: Twayne Publishers, 1981).

Further reading

 Mortkowicz-Olczakowa, Hanna (1961). Bunt wspomnień. Państwowy Instytut Wydawniczy.

External links

 Krzysztof Kamil Baczyński at Culture.pl
 Krzysztof Kamil Baczyński's poems at poezja.org
 Krzysztof Kamil Baczyński biography and poems
 

1921 births
1944 deaths
Warsaw Uprising insurgents
Writers from Warsaw
Home Army members
Burials at Powązki Military Cemetery
Recipients of the Armia Krajowa Cross
Polish Scouts and Guides
Polish socialists
Polish people of Jewish descent
Resistance members killed by Nazi Germany
University of Warsaw alumni
20th-century Polish poets
20th-century Polish male writers
Jewish resistance members during the Holocaust
Polish civilians killed in World War II
Deaths by firearm in Poland